Theodor Bastard is a band, from St Petersburg, Russia. Theodor Bastard were pioneers of world and neofolk music genres in Russia. Also elements of dark wave, trip hop and ambient are present in the band's music. The themes of band's songs are very far from everyday problems, they are based on mythology and fantasy. The hallmark of the band is a female vocal by Yana Veva – the lead vocalist and author of many songs. She often sings in idiosyncratic language invented by her and in rare languages ranging from African and Asian to Native American and many more. Theodor Bastard albums were released in 5 countries: Russia, Germany, Turkey, Mexico, Argentina.

Theodor Bastard's musicians use classical instruments: cello, harp as well as electronic instruments: synthesizers, samplers, theremin and ethnic instruments: nyckelharpa, jouhikko, darbuka, ashiko, conga, djembe, daf, didgeridoo, bağlama, gusli, cimbalom, dulcimer, caxixi, agogô, bawu, mbira, marimba, udu, reco-reco, ocarina, morin khuur, tibetan horn, kangling, cajón, jew's harp, spring drum and many other.

History 
The band was founded in 1995 by Alexander Starostin – guitarist and composer – as a solo project. His stage name is Fedor Svolotch and the birth name of the band was the same. More members joined the band later, in 2000's, including vocalist and composer Yana Veva who also later participated in Shiva in Exile. In 1999 the band's name became Theodor Bastard as the English translation of the stage name 'Fedor Svolotch'. At the beginning they played mostly electronic, industrial, noise music but later, after Yana Veva joining, their style started to crystallize gradually, balancing on the edge of dark wave, world music, neofolk and trip hop.

In 2004 Theodor Bastard released the album Pustota. The album name is a Latin transliteration of the Russian word for emptiness, voidness. Considering a Buddhist concept Shunyata. This album has a great success, it was released in Germany (Pandaimonium Records), Mexico (The Art Records, Noise Kontrol) and Turkey (Muzikal Yapım). In 2014 the remastered version named Pustota (Remastered) came out.

The band performed at famous festivals in Europe: Fusion Festival (2004), Wave-Gotik-Treffen (2011, 2014, 2017), Dark Bombastic Evening (2012, 2013, 2016), Castle Party (2014), Castlefest (2015, 2017), Mėnuo Juodaragis (2008, 2012, 2016) and others.

Theodor Bastard collaborated with many artists: Martin Atkins, Peter Christopherson, Stefan Hertrich, Fun-Da-Mental, Julien Jacob and others.

In November 2011 the album Remixed was released – the collection of remixes of Theodor Bastard's songs. Such artists from all over Europe as Riz Maslen, Animals on Wheels, Up, Bustle and Out, Robin Rimbaud, State of Bengal, Geomatic, Flint Glass and others took part in the work on the collection.

All 2011 Theodor Bastard worked on the new album. They recorded it in several studios at the same time. British band Fun-Da-Mental, African band The Mighty Zulu Nation, French singer Julien Jacob – took part in the recording. Many ethnic instruments as udu, mbira, marimba, reco-reco, caxixi, ashiko, and spring drum were used. Fedor Svolotch also used the instruments that he had invented and made of improvised materials, such as coconuts, door springs, empty bottles, and plastic. In February 2012 the album Oikoumene was released. Its name comes from Ecumene – an ancient Greek term for the known world.

In May 2015, Theodor Bastard released the album Vetvi. Its name is a Latin transliteration of the Russian word for branches bearing in mind the branches of the World tree. The work on this album took three years. On the album we can hear many guest artists: Buryat singer Namgar Lhasaranova from the band Namgar, multi-instrumentalist Phillip Barsky (harp and cimbalom), Olga Glazova (she plays the world's largest gusli), Chamber choir Lauda, vocalist Alexander Platonov (Ensemble of Ancient Peasant Music), Gulya Naumova (violin), Natalia Nazarova (cello). Russian horn, traditional Mongol violin morin khuur, ritual tibetan horn dungchen, ancient Russian gusli (a species of zither), cajón, jew's harp, dulcimer – this is incomplete list of instruments. This album is characterized by special atmosphere of northern dawn.

On December 4, 2017, Theodor Bastard released the soundtrack album Utopia for the game Pathologic 2 – the long-awaited remake of the game Pathologic from Ice-Pick Lodge.

In the beginning of 2018 Theodor Bastard have finished the whole soundtrack for another awaited game – Life is Feudal: MMO, with 30 tracks, with many instruments including medieval and with vocal by Yana Veva.

10 year anniversary edition of the album Beloe was released in November 2018. This is the new version, re-mixed and remastered by Fedor Svolotch. The best tracks (according to musicians) are collected from the both releases of the album – Russian Белое: Ловля Злых Зверей 2008 and Argentinian Beloe: Hunting For Fierce Beasts 2010.

The album Volch'ya Yagoda was released in April 2020. The album name means literally "Wolf's Berry" – the berry that belongs to a wolf. This is a common Russian name for forest dangerous (poisonous) berries. The widespread translation as wolfberry is a misunderstanding, wolfberry is not dangerous and doesn't grow in the wild in Russia.

Members

Current members 
 Fedor Svolotch — guitars, sampler, vocals (1999–present)
 Yana Veva — vocals, bawu, ocarina (1999–present)
 Alexey "Kusas" Kurasov — ethnic percussions, winds (1999–present)
 Alexey Kalinovskiy — keyboards (2014–present)
 Vyacheslav Salikov — cello (2019—present) (live member from 2018 to 2019)
 Sergey Smirnov — drums (2019—present)
 Ekaterina Dolmatova — backing vocals, gusli, flute (2019—present) (live member from 2018 to 2019)

Former members 
 Taras "Monthy" Frolov — keyboards (1999–2008) (live in 2014)
 Maxim "Max" Kostyunin — bass (1999–2008) (live in 2014)
 Anton Urazov — programming, sampler, jew's harp (2001–2005)
 Andrey "Andy Vladych" Dmitriev — drums (2009–2018)

Former touring/session members 
 Alexey Bazhenov — electric piano (2003)
 Mila Fedorova — cello (2004, 2005, 2007, 2008)
 Thorsten Berg — acoustic guitar (2004)
 Gregh Dotson — electric piano (2005)
 Maria Akimova — gusli (2008)
 Alexey "Prokhor" Mostiev — theremin (2008, 2010, 2015)
 Yan Nikitin — vocals (2007, 2008, 2010)
 ? — percussion (2009)
 Zmitser von Holzman — theremin, clarinet (2010, 2012)
 Vladimir Belov — cello (2010, 2013)
 ? — bass (2010)
 ? — drums (2011–2012)
 Valeria Atanova — backing vocals (2012)
 Eduard Dragunov — jew's harp, singing bowl, didgeridoo, throat singing (2012)
 Taras "Monthy" Frolov — keyboards (2012, 2014)
 Radik Tyulyush — shoor (2012)
 ? — keyboards (2012)
 Alia Sagitova — keyboards (2013)
 ? — cello (2013)
 ? — harp (2013)
 Vasil' Davletshin — bass (2013, 2016)
 Filipp Barskiy — harp, dulcimer (2013)
 Viktor Kabanov — theremin (2013)
 Maxim "Max" Kostyunin — bass, double bass (2014)
 ? — flute (2014, 2015)
 Natalia Nazarova — cello (2015)
 Kirill Sekerzhitskiy — bass (2015)
 Olga Glazova — gusli, backing vocals (2015, 2017)
 ? — backing vocals (2015)
 Ilya Kartashov — cello (2015, 2016, 2017)
 Ekaterina Dolmatova — backing vocals (2016, 2018–2019) (official member since 2019)
 Evgeniy Vikki — balalaika, bouzouki, flute (2017)
 Vitaliy Pogosyan — duduk (2017)
 Timofey Smagliev — drums (2018–2019)
 Vyacheslav Salikov — cello (2018–2019) (official member since 2019)
 Christine Kazaryan — harp

Directors of the group 
 Alexey Bazhin — director (2009–2014)
 Maxim Krupoderya — director (2014–2016)
 Denis Knyazev — director (2017–2021) († 2 May 2021)

Timeline

Discography

Fedor Svoloch (Фёдор Сволочь)

Wave Save

Theodor Bastard

Studio albums

Live albums

Compilation albums

Soundtrack albums

Reissue albums

Singles

Festivals 

 2000 - Свободный Полёт-2 (Russia)
 2000 - Другая Культура (Russia)
 2000 - Ушки В Трубочку-4 (Russia)
 2001 – V международный фестиваль им. С. Курехина (СКИФ) (Russia)
 2001 - Свободный Полёт IV (Russia)
 2001 - Кислотный Тест (Russia)
 2001 - Индустрия Звука (Russia)
 2002 – Radio Inferno (Russia)
 2003 – Faut Qu'ca Bouge (Belgium)
 2004 – Fusion Festival (Germany)
 2008 – Mėnuo Juodaragis XI (Lithuania)
 2010 - Этномеханика (Russia)
 2010 – Queer festival (Russia)
 2011 – Wave-Gotik-Treffen (Germany)
 2012 – Dark Bombastic Evening 4 (Romania)
 2012 – Fekete Zaj (Hungary)
 2012 – Mėnuo Juodaragis XV (Lithuania)
 2012 – KAMWA (Russia)
 2012 – Дикая Мята (Russia)
 2013 – ReRe:Riga (Latvia)
 2013 – Dark Bombastic Evening 5 (Romania)
 2013 – Fekete Zaj (Hungary)
 2013 – Вольнае паветра (Belarus)
 2014 – Wave-Gotik-Treffen (Germany)
 2014 - Движение (Russia)
 2014 – Castle Party (Poland)
 2014 – Labadaba (Latvia)
 2014 – Дикая Мята (Russia)
 2015 - Бродский Drive (Russia)
 2015 - Зов Пармы (Russia)
 2015 – Castlefest (Netherlands)
 2016 – Tallinn Music Week (Estonia)
 2016 - Троица: Всё живое (Russia)
 2016 – Дикая Мята (Russia)
 2016 – Dark Bombastic Evening 7 (Romania)
 2016 – Mėnuo Juodaragis XIX (Lithuania)
 2016 - Алтея (Russia)
 2017 – Music Drive (Armenia)
 2017 – Wave-Gotik-Treffen (Germany)
 2017 - МИР Сибири (Russia)
 2017 - Белый шум (Russia)
 2017 - Метафест (Russia)
 2017 – Castlefest (Netherlands)
 2017 – FourЭ (Kazakhstan)
 2017 - Камяніца (Belarus)

External links 

 Theodor Bastard official site
 Theodor Bastard Youtube channel
 Theodor Bastard on Facebook
 Theodor Bastard on Instagram
 Theodor Bastard on SoundCloud
 Theodor Bastard on Bandcamp
 Theodor Bastard at Last.fm
 Theodor Bastard at Discogs
 Theodor Bastard at CdBaby
 Theodor Bastard on Myspace

References 

Musical groups from Saint Petersburg
Russian experimental musical groups
Russian world music groups
Musical groups established in 1996
1996 establishments in Russia
Russian rock music groups
Russian folk music groups
Russian folk rock groups
Trip hop groups
Neofolk music groups